The 2010 Western Illinois Leathernecks football team represented Western Illinois University in the 2010 NCAA Division I FCS football season. The team was led by Mark Hendrickson in his third year and second full season as head coach. They played their home games at Hanson Field. The team finished the regular season with an 8–3 overall record and a 5–3 record in Missouri Valley Football Conference play. They qualified for the playoffs, in which they were eliminated by Appalachian State in the second round.

Schedule

References

Western Illinois
Western Illinois Leathernecks football seasons
Western Illinois
Western Illinois Leathernecks football